Lee Hazen (April 2, 1904 – February 13, 1991) was an American attorney, bridge player and baseball player from New York City.

Hazen graduated from Columbia University and received a J.D. from New York University.

Hazen was inducted into the ACBL Hall of Fame in 1997.

Hazen was a partner at the law firm Dannenberg Hazen & Lake, and had been associated with the firm and its predecessors for more than 40 years. As an attorney, he was active in supporting the American Civil Liberties Union, handling many civil rights cases in the 1930s and 1940s. Hazen was also a founder of the National Lawyers Guild. He died at Mount Sinai Medical Center in Manhattan after suffering a heart attack.

Bridge accomplishments

Honors

 ACBL Hall of Fame, 1997

Wins

 North American Bridge Championships (12)
 Masters Individual (1) 1941 
 Wernher Open Pairs (1) 1945 
 Vanderbilt (4) 1939, 1942, 1949, 1958 
 Marcus Cup (1) 1953 
 Reisinger (2) 1945, 1949 
 Spingold (3) 1942, 1947, 1955

Runners-up

 Bermuda Bowl (2) 1956, 1959
 North American Bridge Championships
 Masters Individual (1) 1940 
 von Zedtwitz Life Master Pairs (1) 1946 
 Vanderbilt (2) 1944, 1947 
 Reisinger (2) 1941, 1942 
 Spingold (2) 1945, 1958

References

External links
 
 

1904 births
1991 deaths
American contract bridge players
Bermuda Bowl players
Columbia University alumni
New York University School of Law alumni
Lawyers from New York City
20th-century American lawyers